Michael John Mahon (born 17 September 1944) is an English former footballer who played as a winger. He scored 57 goals in 256 league games during a six-year career in the English Football League.

A former North Shields and Loughborough United player, he turned professional with Port Vale in 1967. He spent two years with the club, before joining York City for the 1969–70 season. Following this he spent three years with Colchester United, before moving to non-league Wimbledon in 1973, despite having been voted Colchester's player of the year and helping the club to win the Watney Cup. He made FA Cup history with the "Dons" in 1975, when he scored the winning goal to knock top-flight Burnley out of the competition.

Career
Mahon started his career with North Shields and Loughborough United before joining Port Vale as an amateur in May 1966. He became a regular in the first team after Jackie Mudie handed him his debut at Vale Park in a 2–1 win over Southport on 20 August 1966, before losing his place in March 1967. His seven goals in 28 games in 1966–67 were enough to win him a professional contract at the Fourth Division club in April 1967. After nine goals in 24 games under Stanley Matthews in 1967–68 and six goals in 37 games under Gordon Lee in 1968–69, he was handed a free transfer to league rivals York City in May 1969.

Having scored 10 goals in 29 league games under Tom Johnston in 1969–70, Mahon moved on to fellow Fourth Division outfit Colchester United in August 1970. He was a member of Dick Graham's team that knocked Leeds United out of the FA Cup in 1971. He scored seven goals in 47 appearances in 1970–71, and scored 12 goals in 49 games in 1971–72, including two in the Watney Cup final victory over West Bromwich Albion. Mahon finished as the club's top scorer and player of the year under Jim Smith in 1972–73 with 12 goals in 48 games. He played 158 games for the "U's" in all competitions, scoring 33 goals, before joining Wimbledon for a £1,500 fee in December 1973. He was a member of the Wimbledon side that beat Burnley in the Third Round of the FA Cup in 1975, and he scored the winning goal in their 1–0 victory. It was the first time in more than fifty years a non-league side had beaten a top-flight side away from home in the FA Cup.

Post-retirement
Once retiring from the game, Mahon became a school examination officer. During the late 1970s 1980s taught as PE teacher at Phillip Morant & St. Benedicts School, Colchester, both a short distance from Layer Road ground.

Career statistics
Source:

Honours
Colchester United
 Watney Cup: 1972

Wimbledon
 Southern Football League: 1974–75, 1975–76

Individual
 Colchester United Player of the Year: 1973
 Colchester United Hall of Fame

References

1944 births
Living people
Footballers from Manchester
English footballers
Association football wingers
North Shields F.C. players
Newcastle United F.C. players
Port Vale F.C. players
York City F.C. players
Colchester United F.C. players
Wimbledon F.C. players
English Football League players